The Anglican Diocese of Kontagora is one of eleven within the Anglican Province of Lokoja, itself one of 14 provinces within the Church of Nigeria. The current bishop is Jonah Ibrahim

Notes

Church of Nigeria dioceses
Dioceses of the Province of Lokoja